Denis Wucherer (born 7 May 1973 in Mainz) is a German professional basketball coach and former player. He is 1.96 m (6 ft 5 in) tall and played shooting guard.

Professional career

As player
Wucherer has played professional basketball in Germany (TV Langen, Bayer Giants Leverkusen, DJK Würzburg and Frankfurt Skyliners), Italy (Sony Milano, Varese Roosters, Benetton Treviso) and Belgium (Telindus BC Oostende). Most notable was his time for the Bayer Giants Leverkusen where he won 6 national titles and was known for triple doubles which he accomplished on several occasions.

As coach
Wucherer coached the Basketball Bundesliga team Gießen 46ers several years before he became head coach for the ProA team RheinStars Köln in 2017.
He later joined s.Oliver Würzburg as head coach.

German national team
Wucherer has played for the German national basketball team 123 times. His biggest success there was the silver medal at the EuroBasket 2005.

Honors
As player:
4× German League champion: 1992–93, 1993–94, 1994–95, 1995–1996
2× Belgian League champion: 2005–06, 2006–07
2× German Cup champion: 1993, 1995
Italian Cup champion: 2005

As head coach:
National Championships:
German 2nd League champion: 2014–15

References

1973 births
Living people
German basketball coaches
German men's basketball players
Gießen 46ers coaches
S.Oliver Würzburg coaches
Shooting guards
Sportspeople from Mainz
RheinStars Köln coaches